Cowshill is a village in County Durham, England. It is situated at the top of Weardale, between Lanehead and Wearhead. In the 2001 census Cowshill had a population of 156.

The Church of St Thomas (1912) is located in Cowshill, and is the parish church for Heatherycleugh parish. Bridge End Cottage is notable for being a 17th-century Bastle house, and is a Grade II listed building. The Cowshill War Memorial commemorates the seven men from the area lost in the First World War and three who died in the Second World War.

Burtree Ford was once considered a separate village, now considered as part of Cowshill, but its name is still apparent in Burtree Farm, and Burtreeford Bridge, over Killhope Burn, and the former Burtreeford Mill.

References

External links

Villages in County Durham
Stanhope, County Durham